Thomas Tatchell (13 June 1867 – 18 October 1936) was an Australian cricketer. He played two first-class cricket matches for Victoria between 1894 and 1895.

Tatchell was born into a sporting family, with all his brothers being active sportsmen. He attended Wesley College in his youth and played football in Bendigo. After moving to Melbourne he became a cricketer and he eventually captained both South Melbourne and Richmond in district cricket and he represented Victoria in first-class cricket. He also represented Victoria in inter-state tennis, playing competitively for over twenty years. In 1919 he took up bowls and became captain of the Heidelberg Bowls Club.

See also
 List of Victoria first-class cricketers

References

External links
 

1867 births
1936 deaths
Australian cricketers
Victoria cricketers
People from Inglewood, Victoria